Gensui Count Terauchi Masatake, GCB (5 February 1852 – 3 November 1919), was a Japanese military officer, proconsul and politician.  He was a Gensui (or Marshal) in the Imperial Japanese Army and the Prime Minister of Japan from 1916 to 1918.

Biography

Military career
Terauchi Masatake was born in Hirai Village, Suo Province (present-day Yamaguchi city, Yamaguchi Prefecture), and was the third son of Utada Masasuke, a samurai in the service of Chōshū Domain. He was later adopted by a relative on his mother's side of the family, Terauchi Kanuemon, and changed his family name to "Terauchi". 

As a youth, he was a member of the Kiheitai militia from 1864, and fought in the Boshin War against the Tokugawa shogunate from 1867, most notably at the Battle of Hakodate. After the victory at Hakodate, he travelled to Kyoto, where he joined the Ministry of War and was drilled by French instructors in Western weaponry and tactics. He became a member of Emperor Meiji's personal guard in 1870 and travelled with the Emperor to Tokyo. He left military service in 1871 to pursue language studies, but was recalled with the formation  the fledgling Imperial Japanese Army in 1871 and was commissioned as a second lieutenant after attending the Army's Toyama School. He was appointed to the staff of the new Imperial Japanese Army Academy in 1873. he fought in the Satsuma Rebellion in 1877 and was injured and lost his right hand during the Battle of Tabaruzaka. His physical disability did not prove to be an impediment to his future military and political career. 

In 1882, he was sent to France as aide-de-camp to Prince Kan'in Kotohito and was appointed a  military attaché the following year. He remained in France for studies until 1886. On his return to Japan, he was appointed deputy secretary to the Minister of the Army. In 1887, he became commandant of the Army Academy. In 1891, he was chief of staff to the IJA 1st Division and in 1892 was Chief of the First Bureau (Operations) of the Imperial Japanese Army General Staff.

With the start of the First Sino-Japanese War in 1894, Terauchi was appointed Secretary of Transportation and Communication for the Imperial General Headquarters, which made him responsible for all movement of troops and supplies during the war. In 1896, he was assigned command of the IJA 3rd Infantry Brigade.  In 1898, he was promoted to become the first Inspector General of Military Training, which he made one of the three highest positions in the army. In 1900, he became Deputy Chief of Staff of the Army, and went to China to personally oversee Japanese force during the Boxer Rebellion

Political career

Terauchi was appointed as Minister of the Army in 1901, during the first Katsura administration. The Russo-Japanese War (1904–1905) occurred during his term in office. After the Japanese victory in the war, he was ennobled with the title of danshaku (baron) in the kazoku peerage. He was also made a chairman of the South Manchurian Railway Company in 1906.In 1907, in recognition of the four wars he had served in, his peerage title was elevated to that of shishaku (viscount),

He continued in office as Army Minister under the first Saionji administration and the second Katsura administration from July 1908 to August 1911.

Korean Resident-General
Following the assassination of former Prime Minister Itō Hirobumi in Harbin by a Korean nationalist, Joong-Geun Ahn in October 1909, Terauchi was appointed to replace Sone Arasuke as the third and last Japanese Resident-General of Korea in May 1910. As Resident-General, he executed the Japan–Korea Annexation Treaty in August of the same year, and he thus became the first Japanese Governor-General of Korea. In this position, he reported directly to the Emperor and as proconsul had wide-ranging powers ranging from legislative, administrative, and judicial to effect changes and reforms. The annexation of Korea by Japan and subsequent policies introduced by the new government was highly unpopular with the majority of the Korean population, and Terauchi (who concurrently maintained his position as Army Minister) employed military force to maintain control. However, he preferred to use the deep historical and cultural ties between Korea and Japan as justification for the eventual goal of complete assimilation of Korea into the Japanese mainstream. To this end, thousands of schools were built across Korea. Although this contributed greatly to an increase in literacy and the educational standard, the curriculum was centered on Japanese language and Japanese history, with the intent of assimilation of the populace into loyal subjects of the Japanese Empire.

Other of Terauchi's policies also had noble goals but unforeseen consequences. For example, land reform was desperately needed in Korea. The Korean land ownership system was a complex system of absentee landlords, partial owner-tenants, and cultivators with traditional but without legal proof of ownership. Terauchi's new Land Survey Bureau conducted cadastral surveys that reestablished ownership by basis of written proof (deeds, titles, and similar documents). Ownership was denied to those who could not provide such written documentation (mostly lower class and partial owners, who had only traditional verbal "cultivator rights"). Although the plan succeeded in reforming land ownership/taxation structures, it added tremendously to Korean hostility, bitterness, and resentment towards Japanese administration by enabling a huge amount of Korean land (roughly 2/3 of all privately-owned lands by some estimates) to be seized by the government and sold to Japanese developers.

In recognition of his work in Korea, his title was raised to that of hakushaku (count) in 1911.

Isabel Anderson, who visited Korea and met Count Terauchi in 1912, wrote as follows:
  As Prime Minister 
In June 1916, Terauchi  he received his promotion to the largely ceremonial rank of Gensui (or Field Marshal). In October, he became Prime Minister, and concurrently held the cabinet posts of  Foreign Minister and Finance Minister. His cabinet consisted solely of career bureaucrats as he distrusted career civilian politicians. 

During his tenure, Terauchi pursued an aggressive foreign policy. He oversaw the Nishihara Loans (made to support the Chinese warlord Duan Qirui in exchange for confirmation of Japanese claims to parts of Shandong Province and increased rights in Manchuria) and the Lansing–Ishii Agreement (recognizing Japan's special rights in China). Terauchi upheld Japan's obligations to the United Kingdom under the Anglo-Japanese Alliance in World War I, dispatching ships from the Imperial Japanese Navy to the South Pacific, Indian Ocean and Mediterranean, and seizing control of German colonies in Tsingtao and the Pacific Ocean. After the war, Japan joined the Allies in the Siberian Intervention (whereby Japan sent troops into Siberia in support of White Russian forces against the Bolshevik Red Army in the Russian Revolution).

In September 1918, Terauchi resigned his office, due to the rice riots that had spread throughout Japan due to inflation; he died the following year.

His decorations included the Order of the Rising Sun (1st class) and Order of the Golden Kite (1st Class).

The billiken doll, which was a Kewpie-like fad toy invented in 1908 and was very popular in Japan, lent its name to the Terauchi administration, partly due to the doll's uncanny resemblance to Count Terauchi's bald head.

Legacy
Terauchi's eldest son, Count Terauchi Hisaichi, was the commander of the Imperial Japanese Army's Southern Expeditionary Army Group during World War II. The 2nd Count Terauchi also held the rank of Gensui (or Marshal) like his father. Terauchi's eldest daughter married Count Hideo Kodama, the son of General Kodama Gentaro.

HonoursFrom the corresponding article in the Japanese WikipediaPeerages
Viscount (21 September 1907) 
Count (21 April 1911)

Japanese decorations
 1892 –  Order of the Sacred Treasure, 3rd class 
 1894 –  Order of the Rising Sun, 4th class 
 1895 –  Order of the Golden Kite, 3rd class 
 1895 –   Order of the Rising Sun, 3rd class 
 1899 -  Order of the Sacred Treasure, 2nd class 
 1901 –  Grand Cordon of the Order of the Rising Sun
 1901 –  Order of the Rising Sun, 4th class 
 1906 –  Order of the Golden Kite, 1st class
 1906 –  Order of the Rising Sun with Paulownia Flowers
 1919 –  Grand Cordon of the  Order of the Chrysanthemum (posthumous)

Foreign decorations (partial list)
 1886 –  France - Legion of Honour, Chevalier 
 1891 –  France - Legion of Honour, Officier 
 1894 –  Ottoman Empire - Order of the Medjidie, Commandeur 
 1897  –  - Russia - Order of Saint Stanislaus, 1st class 
 1897 –  France - Legion of Honour, Commandeur 
 1906 – Knight Grand Cross of the Order of the Bath (GCB) (15 March 1906)
 1907 –  Annam - Order of the Dragon of Annam, Commander 

Popular culture
 Portrayed by Lee Young-seok in the 2015 film Assassination.
References

 Craig, Albert M. Chōshū in the Meiji Restoration. Cambridge: Harvard University Press, 1961. OCLC 482814571
Duus, Peter. The Abacus and the Sword: The Japanese Penetration of Korea, 1895-1910 (Twentieth-Century Japan - the Emergence of a World Power. University of California Press (1998). .
 Dupuy, Trevor N. Harper Encyclopedia of Military Biography. New York: HarperCollins Publishers Inc., 1992. 
 Jansen, Marius B. and Gilbert Rozman, eds. (1986). Japan in Transition: from Tokugawa to Meiji. Princeton: Princeton University Press. ;  OCLC 12311985
  . (2000). The Making of Modern Japan.'' Cambridge: Harvard University Press. ;  OCLC 44090600
 Nussbaum, Louis-Frédéric and Käthe Roth. (2005).  Japan encyclopedia. Cambridge: Harvard University Press. ;  OCLC 58053128

External links

|-

|-

|-

|-

|-

|-

|-

1852 births
1919 deaths
People from Yamaguchi (city)
People of Meiji-period Japan
Kazoku
Japanese generals
20th-century prime ministers of Japan
Prime Ministers of Japan
Ministers of Finance of Japan
Governors-General of Korea
Japanese Residents-General of Korea
Japanese amputees
Japanese military attachés
Marshals of Japan
Government ministers of Japan
Foreign ministers of Japan
Ministers of the Imperial Japanese Army
Japanese people of the Russo-Japanese War
People of the Boshin War
Japanese people of World War I
Grand Cordons of the Order of the Rising Sun
Recipients of the Order of the Rising Sun with Paulownia Flowers
Recipients of the Order of the Sacred Treasure, 2nd class
Recipients of the Order of the Golden Kite, 1st class
Honorary Knights Grand Cross of the Order of the Bath
Commandeurs of the Légion d'honneur
Recipients of the Order of the Dragon of Annam